Ernst Bachrich (30 May 1892 or 1893 – 11 July 1942) was an Austrian composer, conductor, and pianist.

He composed piano music, chamber music and Lieder.

Biography
Born in 1892 or 1893 in Vienna, he studied law at the University of Vienna.

He studied music with Carl Prohaska and Carl Lafite. He studied privately with Arnold Schoenberg from June 1916 to September 1917. In 1917 and 1918 he took part in Schoenberg's composition seminar.

He was conductor at the Vienna Volksoper from 1920 to 1925.

In 1928 he became Kapellmeister at the Düsseldorf city theatre and in 1931 he took up the same post in Duisburg.

In 1936 he collaborated with Marcel Rubin and Friedrich Wildgans to organize a series of concerts in Vienna, entitled "Music of the Present".

On 15 May 1942 he was deported by the Nazis to Izbica. He was murdered on 10 or 11 July 1942 in the Majdanek/Lublin concentration camp.

References
Material from the biography under External links

External links
Biography  by the Doblinger Publisher

1890s births
1942 deaths
Austrian male composers
Austrian composers
Austrian classical pianists
Male classical pianists
Male conductors (music)
People who died in Majdanek concentration camp
Austrian civilians killed in World War II
Musicians from Vienna
Austrian people executed in Nazi concentration camps
20th-century Austrian conductors (music)
20th-century Austrian male musicians
20th-century Austrian composers
20th-century classical pianists
University of Vienna alumni